Badminton at the 2013 Southeast Asian Games was held in Wunna Theikdi Indoor Stadium, Myanmar between 10–14 December. This edition was the first time that team event was not held.

Medal summary

Medal table

Events

References

From Badminton World Federation (BWF):
 Men's singles result
 Women's singles result
 Men's doubles result
 Women's doubles result
 Mixed doubles's result

 
2013 Southeast Asian Games events
2013
Southeast Asian Games
Badminton tournaments in Myanmar